Václav Pěcháček (born 26 March 1959) is a retired Czech football defender.

References

1959 births
Living people
Czech footballers
FC Baník Ostrava players
Dukla Prague footballers
Czech First League players
Association football defenders
Czechoslovakia under-21 international footballers